TouVelle State Recreation Site is a state park, administered  by Oregon Parks and Recreation Department, and located in Jackson County, Oregon, United States,  north of Medford, where Table Rock Road crosses the Rogue River.  This  park is used for fishing, birding, hiking (in the adjacent Denman Wildlife Area), picnicking and swimming.  There is also a boat ramp, which lies at the lower end of an easily navigated stretch of the Rogue.  A daily user-fee  or annual permit is required.

References

External links
 

State parks of Oregon
Parks in Jackson County, Oregon
White City, Oregon